The Irish Repertory Theatre is an Off Broadway theatre founded in 1988.

History
The Irish Repertory Theatre was founded by Ciarán O'Reilly and Charlotte Moore, which opened its doors in September 1988, with Sean O'Casey's The Plough and the Stars.
The mission of the theatre was and remains:

to bring works by Irish and Irish American masters and contemporary playwrights to American audiences, to provide a context for understanding the contemporary Irish American experience, and to encourage the development of new works focusing on the Irish and Irish American experience, as well as a range of other cultures.

In 1995, the company moved to its permanent home in Chelsea on three completely renovated floors of a former warehouse, allowing for both a Main Stage theatre and a smaller studio space, the W. Scott McLucas Studio. The Irish Repertory Theatre is the only year-round theatre company in New York City devoted to bringing Irish and Irish American works to the stage.

The theater has been recognized with a 2007 Jujamcyn Award, a special Drama Desk Award for "Excellence in Presenting Distinguished Irish drama," and the Lucille Lortel Award for "Outstanding Body of Work." Its productions draw more than 35,000 audience members annually.

Irish American Writers & Artists Inc. honored the theatre with the Eugene O'Neill Lifetime Achievement Award in 2011.

In 2014, The Irish Repertory Theatre started a renovation of their home in Chelsea. For the 2014-15 season, Irish Rep's performances were held at the DR2 Theater near Union Square.

During the holiday seasons of 2016 and 2017, the American Irish Historical Society headquarters on Fifth Avenue was home to the Irish Repertory Theatre's production of The Dead, 1904. The show was an adaptation of James Joyce's short story "The Dead", adapted by novelist Jean Hanff Korelitz and her husband, Irish poet Paul Muldoon. For The Dead, 1904, the building had 57 guests at a time, who for part of the performance joined the cast for a holiday feast drawn from the original novella.

In 2017, the company received an Obie Grant from the Obie Awards presented by the American Theatre Wing and The Village Voice.

Season history
2023
Endgame by Samuel Beckett
2021-2022 Season
 Bikeman by Tom Flynn, Produced by Robert Cuccioli, in honor of the 20th Anniversary of the 9/11 terrorist attacks, An Immersive Audio Event
 Angela's Ashes: The Musical, Produced by Pat Moylan, Music and Lyrics by Adam Howell, Book by Paul Hurt, Based on the book by Frank McCourt
 Autumn Royal by Kevin Barry
 A Girl is a Half-formed Thing by Eimear McBride, Adapted by Annie Ryan
 The Streets of New York written by Dion Boucicault, directed by Charlotte Moore
 Made By God by Ciara Ní Chuirc, directed by Olivia Songer
 A Touch of the Poet by Eugene O’Neill, directed by Ciarán O’Reilly 
 Two By Synge by JM Synge, directed by Charlotte Moore

2020-2021 Season
 Irish Rep Online
 Digital Fall Season
 Belfast Blues written and performed by Geraldine Hughes, A Performance on Screen
 Give Me Your Hand A Poetical Stroll through The National Gallery of London, Poems by Paul Durcan, A Performance on Screen
 A Touch of the Poet by Eugene O'Neill, A Performance on Screen
 On Beckett/In Screen conceived and performed by Bill Irwin, A Performance on Screen
 Meet Me in St. Louis, Book by Hugh Wheeler, Songs by Hugh Martin & Ralph Blane, Adapted & Directed by Charlotte Moore, A Holiday Special in Song and on Screen
 The Aran Islands by J.M. Synge, adapted & directed by Joe O'Byrne
 John Cullum: An Accidental Star, Conceived by John Cullum and Jeff Berger, Written by David Thompson, in association Vineyard Theatre and Goodspeed Musicals with Jeff Berger, Directed by Lonny Price and Matt Cowart
 Little Gem by Elaine Murphy
 The Man Who Wanted to Fly, directed by Frank Shouldice, A NY Film Premiere starring Bobby Coote
 Digital Summer Season
 Ghosting by Jamie Beamish and Anne O'Riordan, A Theatre Royal, Waterford & Throwin Shapes Production, A Performance on Screen
 The Cordelia Dream by Marina Carr, A Performance on Screen

2019-2020 Season
 Kingfishers Catch Fire by Robin Glendinning
 Dublin Carol by Conor McPherson
 Pumpgirl by Abbie Spallen
 The Scourge by Michelle Dooley Mahon, in association with Wexford Arts Centre
 London Assurance by Dion Boucicault
 Lady G: Plays and Whisperings of Lady Gregory by Lady Augusta Gregory, additional material by Ciarán O'Reilly
 Incantata by Paul Muldoon, in association with Galway International Arts Festival and Jen Coppinger Productions
 Irish Rep Online
 Summer Online Season
 Molly Sweeney by Brian Friel, A Performance on Screen
 The Gifts You Gave to the Dark by Darren Murphy
 YES! Reflections of Molly Bloom From the novel Ulysses by James Joyce, Adapted for stage by Aedín Moloney & Colum McCann, A Performance on Screen
 The Weir by Conor McPherson, A Performance on Screen
 Love, Noël written and devised by Barry Day, A Performance on Screen
 Postponed Due to COVID-19
 The Smuggler by Ronán Noone
 A Touch of the Poet by Eugene O'Neill

2018-2019 Season
 Wild Abandon by Leenya Rideout
 On Beckett conceived and performed by Bill Irwin with writings by Samuel Beckett
 Two by Friel by Brian Friel
 A Child’s Christmas in Wales by Dylan Thomas, adapted and directed by Charlotte Moore
 The Dead, 1904 based on the short story by James Joyce, adapted by Paul Muldoon & Jean Hanff Korelitz
 The Seán O'Casey Season
 The Shadow of a Gunman by Seán O'Casey
 Juno and the Paycock by Seán O'Casey
 The Plough and the Stars by Seán O'Casey
 YES! Reflections of Molly Bloom From the novel Ulysses by James Joyce, Adapted for stage by Aedín Moloney & Colum McCann
 Love, Noël written and devised by Barry Day
 Little Gem by Elaine Murphy

2017-2018 Season
 The Home Place by Brian Friel
 Off the Meter, On the Record by John McDonagh
 It’s A Wonderful Life by Anthony Palermo
 The Dead, 1904 based on the short story by James Joyce, adapted by Paul Muldoon & Jean Hanff Korelitz
 Jimmy Titanic by Bernard McMullan
 Disco Pigs by Enda Walsh
 Three Small Irish Masterpieces by WB Yeats, Lady Gregory, and John Millington Synge
 The Seafarer by Conor McPherson
 Woman and Scarecrow by Marina Carr
 On A Clear Day You Can See Forever by Alan Jay Lerner

2016-2017 Season
 Afterplay by Brian Friel
 Finian’s Rainbow music by Burton Lane, book by E.Y. Harburg & Fred Saidy, lyrics by E.Y. Harburg
 The Pigeon in The Taj Mahal by Laoisa Sexton
 by Laoisa Sexton
 The Dead, 1904 based on the short story by James Joyce, adapted by Paul Muldoon & Jean Hanff Korelitz
 Crackskull Row by Honor Molloy
 The Emperor Jones by Eugene O'Neill
 Rebel in the Soul by Larry Kirwan
 Woody Sez: The Life & Music of Woody Guthrie devised by David M. Lutken with Nick Corley and Darcie Deaville, Helen Jean Russell & Andy Teirstein
 The Aran Islands by J.M. Synge, adapted & directed by Joe O'Byrne

2015-2016 Season
 The Quare Land by John McManus
 A Child’s Christmas in Wales by Dylan Thomas
 The Burial At Thebes by Seamus Heaney
 A Celebration of Harold Pinter with Julian Sands
 Shining City by Conor McPherson
 Quietly by Owen McCafferty

2014–2015 Season
 Port Authority by Conor McPherson
 A Christmas Memory by Truman Capote, adapted by Larry Grossman  and Carol Hall
 Da by Hugh Leonard
 The Belle of Belfast by Nate Rufus Edelman
 The Weir by Conor McPherson

2013-2014 Season
 Juno and the Paycock by Seán O'Casey
 A Mind-Bending Evening of Beckett by Samuel Beckett
 It's a Wonderful Life adapted by Anthony E. Palermo
 Transport book by Thomas Keneally, music and lyrics by Larry Kirwan
 Sea Marks by Gardner McKay

2012 – 2013
 The Freedom of the City by Brian Friel
 It's a Wonderful Life adapted by Anthony E. Palermo
 A Celebration of Harold Pinter starring Julian Sands, directed by John Malkovich
 The Songs I Love So Well starring Phil Coulter
 Airswimming by Charlotte Jones
 Donnybrook! book by Robert E. McEnroe; music and lyrics by Johnny Burke
 For Love by Laoisa Sexton
 Who's Your Daddy? by Johnny O'Callaghan
 The Weir by Conor McPherson
 Gibraltar by Patrick Fitzgerald

2011 – 2012
 Weep for the Virgins by Nellise Child
 Noctu conceived and directed by Breandán de Gallaí
 Dancing at Lughnasa by Brian Friel
 Beyond the Horizon by Eugene O'Neill
 Give Me Your Hand by Paul Duncan
 Man and Superman by George Bernard Shaw
 New Girl in Town book by George Abbott, music and lyrics by Bob Merrill

2010 – 2011
 Banished Children of Eve  by Kelly Younger, adapted from the novel by Peter Quinn
 St. Nicholas by Conor McPherson
 A Child's Christmas in Wales by Dylan Thomas
 Molly Sweeney by Brian Friel
 My Scandalous Life by Thomas Kilroy
 The Shaughraun by Dion Boucicault

2009–2010
 The Emperor Jones by Eugene O'Neill
 Ernest in Love by Oscar Wilde
 Candida by George Bernard Shaw
 White Woman Street by Sebastian Barry
 The Irish ... and How They Got That Way by Frank McCourt

2008–2009
 After Luke & When I Was God by Cónal Creedon
 The Yeats Project by W. B. Yeats
 Aristocrats by Brian Friel
 A Child's Christmas in Wales based on the story by Dylan Thomas
 The Master Builder by Henrik Ibsen adapted by Frank McGuinness
 Confessions of an Irish Publican from the writings of John B. Keane, adapted by Des Keogh

2007–2008
 Around the World in 80 Days by Mark Brown, based on the novel by Jules Verne
 Prisoner of the Crown by Richard Stockton, Additional Material and Original Concept by Richard T. Herd
 Take Me Along, Book by Joseph Stein and Bob Russell, Lyrics and Music by Bob Merrill
 A Child's Christmas in Wales by Dylan Thomas
 The Devil's Disciple by George Bernard Shaw
 Sive by John B. Keane

2006–2007
 Tom Crean – Antarctic Explorer by Aidan Dooley
 Gaslight by Patrick Hamilton
 Defender of the Faith by Stuart Carolan
 Meet Me in St. Louis, Book by Hugh Wheeler, Songs by Hugh Martin and Ralph Blane
 Irish One Acts:  Great White American Teeth by Fiona Walsh and Swansong by Conor McDermottroe
 The Hairy Ape by Eugene O'Neill

2005–2006
 Mr. Dooley's America by Philip Dunne and Martin Blaine
 The Field by John B. Keane
 You Don't have to be Irish by Malacy McCourt
 George M. Cohan, Tonight! by Chip Deffaa and George M. Cohan
 The Bells of Christmas conceived by Ciarán O'Reilly
 Mrs. Warren's Profession by George Bernard Shaw
 Beowulf adaptation and lyrics by Lindsey Turner, music and lyrics by Lenny Pickett

2004–2005
 Philadelphia, Here I Come! by Brian Friel
 She Stoops to Conquer by Oliver Goldsmith
 Endgame by Samuel Beckett
 After the Ball by Noël Coward

2003–2004
 Triptych by Enda O'Brien
 The Colleen Bawn by Dion Boucicault
 Christmas With Tommy Makem by Tommy Makem
 Eden by Eugene O'Brien
 Finian's Rainbow by E.Y. Harburg, Burton Lane and Fred Saidy, adapted by Charlotte Moore
 Let's Put On A Show! with Jan and Mickey Rooney

2002–2003
 Bailegangaire by Tom Murphy
 A Celtic Christmas arranged by Charlotte Moore
 Bedbound by Edna Walsh
 The Love-Hungry Farmer by John B. Keane and adapted for the stage by Des Keogh
 Foley by Michael West
 Peg O' My Heart by J. Hartley Manners, songs by Charlotte Moore

2001–2002
 Save It for the Stage: The Life of Reilly by Charles Nelson Reilly and Paul Linke
 The Streets of New York by Dion Boucicault, adaptation and songs by Charlotte Moore
 That and the Cup of Tea by Carmel Quinn and Sean Fuller
 A Child's Christmas in Wales by Dylan Thomas
 The Matchmaker by John B. Keane and adapted for the stage by Phyllis Ryan
 An Evening in New York with W.B. Yeats and John Quinn, adapted by Neil Bradley and Paul Kerry
 Pigtown by Mike Finn
 The Playboy of the Western World by J.M. Synge

2000–2001
 The Hostage by Brendan Behan
 A Child's Christmas in Wales by Dylan Thomas
 The Importance of Being Oscar by Micheál MacLiammóir
 The Picture of Dorian Gray by Oscar Wilde and adapted for the stage by Joe O'Byrne
 A Life by Hugh Leonard
 The Irish ... and How They Got That Way by Frank McCourt

1999–2000
 Invasions and Legacies by Tommy Makem
 Eclipsed by Patricia Burke Brogan
 The Irish ... and How They Got That Way by Frank McCourt
 The Country Boy by John Murphy
 Our Lady of Sligo by Sebastian Barry [view photo gallery]
 Don Juan in Hell by George Bernard Shaw

1998–1999
 The Shaughraun by Dion Boucicault
 Krapp's Last Tape by Samuel Beckett
 A Child's Christmas in Wales by Dylan Thomas
 Oh, Coward! by Roderick Cook
 The Happy Prince by Oscar Wilde
 The Shadow of a Gunman by Seán O'Casey
 Dear Liar by Jerome Kilty

1997–1998
 The Irish ... and How They Got That Way by Frank McCourt
 Major Barbara by George Bernard Shaw [view photo gallery]
 Rafferty Rescues the Moon by June Anderson
 Song at Sunset conceived by Shivaun O'Casey
 Long Day's Journey into Night by Eugene O'Neill

1996–1997
 The Importance of Being Earnest by Oscar Wilde [view photo gallery]
 A Child's Christmas in Wales by Dylan Thomas
 My Astonishing Self by Donal Donnelly
 The Yeats Plays by William Butler Yeats
 The Plough and The Stars by Seán O'Casey [view photo gallery]
 The Nightingale and Not The Lark and The Invisible Man by Jennifer Johnston
 Mass Appeal by Bill C. Davis
 Wait 'til I Tell You by Carmel Quinn

1995–1996
 Same Old Moon by Geraldine Aron
 Juno and the Paycock by Seán O'Casey
 Shimmer by John O'Keefe
 Frank Pig Says Hello by Pat McCabe
 A Whistle in the Dark by Tom Murphy
 Da by Hugh Leonard

1994–1995
 The Au Pair Man by Hugh Leonard
 The Hasty Heart by John Patrick
 Mother of All the Behans by Peter Sheridan
 Alive, Alive, Oh by Milo O'Shea and Kitty Sullivan

1992–1993
 The Madame MacAdam Travelling Theatre by Tom Kilroy
 Joyicity by Ulick O'Connor
 Frankly Brendan by Frank O'Connor and Brendan Behan
 Seconds Out by Young Irish Playwrights

1991–1992
 Grandchild of Kings by Harold Prince [view photo gallery]

 1990=1991
 The Playboy of the Western World by J.M. Synge
 Making History by Brian Friel

1989–1990
 Sea Marks by Gardiner McKay
 English That For Me by Eamon Kelly
 A Whistle in the Dark by Tom Murphy
 Endwords by Chris O'Neill
 Philadelphia, Here I Come! by Brian Friel

1988–1989
 The Plough and The Stars by Seán O'Casey
 I Do Not Like Thee, Dr. Fell by Bernard Farrell
 Yeats! A Celebration by William Butler Yeats
 A Whistle in the Dark by Tom Murphy

Awards
1992

Drama Desk Award, "Excellence in Presenting Distinguished Irish Drama"
Clarence Derwent Award, Patrick Fitzgerald, Grandchild of Kings
Outer Critics Circle Nom., "Best Director" – Hal Prince, Grandchild of Kings
Outer Critics Circle Nom., "Best Actress" – Pauline Flanagan, Grandchild of Kings
Outer Critics Circle Nom., "Best Scenic Design" – Eugene Lee, Grandchild of Kings

1996

Drama Desk Nom., "Best Actress" – Melissa Errico, The Importance of Being Earnest

1997

Drama League Nom., "Best Actress" – Melissa Errico, Major Barbara

1998

The Irish American Heritage and Culture Week Committee of New York City, Board of Education, "Irish Organization of the *Year Award"
Obie Award, "Best Actor" – Daniel Gerroll, The Shaughraun
Obie Award, "Best Actor" – Brian Murray, Long Day’s Journey Into Night
Drama Desk Nom., "Best Actress in a Play" – Frances Sternhagen, Long Day’s Journey Into Night

1999

Outer Critics Circle Nom., "Best Actress" – Marion Seldes, Dear Liar

2000

Drama Desk Nom., "Best Actress" – Sinead Cusack, Our Lady of Sligo
Outer Critic Nom., "Best Actress" – Sinead Cusack, Our Lady of Sligo
Drama Desk Nom., "Best Actor" – Fritz Weaver, A Life

2002

Outer Critics Circle Nom., "Outstanding Solo Performance" – Charles Nelson Reilly, Save it for the Stage: The Life of Reilly
Outer Critics Circle Nom., "Outstanding Off-Broadway Play" – The Matchmaker
Hewes Design Award, "Noteworthy Special Effects" – James Morgan, Pigtown
Drama League Nom., "Distinguished Production of a Musical" – The Streets of New York
Drama League Nom., "Best Actress in a Musical" – Kristin Maloney, The Streets of New York

2004

Drama Desk Nom., "Outstanding Revival of a Play" – The Colleen Bawn
Drama Desk Nom., "Outstanding Revival of a Musical" – Finian’s Rainbow
Drama League Nom., "Distinguished Revival of a Musical" – Finian’s Rainbow
Drama League Nom., "Best Actress in a Play" – Catherine Byrne, Eden 
Drama League Nom., "Best Actress in a Musical" – Melissa Errico, Finian’s Rainbow
Drama League Nom., "Best Actor in a Musical" – Malcolm Gets, Finian’s Rainbow
Joe A. Callaway Award Nom., "Best Director" – Charlotte Moore, Finian’s Rainbow
Edinburgh Theatre Festival Award, "Best Play" – The Love Hungry Farmer 
Edinburgh Theatre Festival Award, "Best Actor" – Des Keogh, The Love Hungry Farmer

2005

Lucille Lortel Award, "Outstanding Body of Work"
Lucille Lortel Nom., "Best Revival" – Finian’s Rainbow
Lucille Lortel Nom., "Best Choreography" – Barry McNabb, Finian’s Rainbow
Drama League Nom., "Best Actor" – Alvin Epstein, Endgame

2006

Obie Award, "Best Actress" – Dana Ivey, Mrs. Warren’s Profession
Drama Desk Nom., "Solo Performance" – Jon Peterson, George M. Cohan, Tonight!
Drama Desk Nom., "Outstanding Revival" – Philadelphia, Here I Come!
Lucille Lortel Nom., "Best Revival" – Mrs. Warren’s Profession
Lucille Lortel Nom., "Outstanding Featured Actress" – Helena Carroll, Philadelphia, Here I Come!
Drama League Nom. – Dana Ivey, Mrs. Warren’s Profession
Drama League Nom. – Jon Peterson, George M. Cohan, Tonight!

2007

The 2007 Jujamcyn Theaters Award
Joe A. Callaway Award Nom., "Best Director" – Ciarán O'Reilly, The Hairy Ape
Lucille Lortel Nom., "Outstanding Scenic Design" – Eugene Lee, The Hairy Ape
Drama Desk Nom., "Outstanding Actress in a Play" – Orlagh Cassidy, The Field
Drama Desk Nom., "Outstanding Revival of a Play" – The Hairy Ape
Drama Desk Nom., "Outstanding Director of a Play" – Ciarán O'Reilly, The Hairy Ape
Drama League Nom., "Distinguished Revival of a Play "- The Hairy Ape
Drama League Nom., "Distinguished Performance Award" – Gregory Derelian and Gerald Finnegan, The Hairy Ape

2008

Lucille Lortel Nom., "Best Actor" – Brian Murray, Gaslight
Drama Desk Nom., "Outstanding Revival of a Musical" – Take Me Along
Drama League Nom., "Distinguished Revival of a Play" – Gaslight
Drama League Nom., "Distinguished Performance Award" – David Staller, Gaslight 
Outer Critics Award, "Outstanding Revival of a Musical" – Take Me Along
St. Patrick’s Committee in Holyoke, "John F. Kennedy National Award" – Charlotte Moore and Ciarán O'Reilly
Irish America, "50 Most Influential Women" – Charlotte Moore

2010

Joe A. Callaway Award, "Best Director" – Ciarán O'Reilly, The Emperor Jones
The O'Neill Credo Award – Ciarán O'Reilly, The Emperor Jones
Joe A. Callaway Award, "Best Performance" – John Douglas Thompson, The Emperor Jones
Lucille Lortel Nom., "Outstanding Revival" – The Emperor Jones
Lucille Lortel Nom., "Outstanding Lead Actor" – John Douglas Thompson, The Emperor Jones
Lucille Lortel Nom., "Outstanding Sound Design" – Ryan Rumery and Christian Frederickson, The Emperor Jones
Drama League Nom., "Distinguished Production of a Play" – The Emperor Jones
Drama League Nom., "Distinguished Performance Award" – John Douglas Thompson, The Emperor Jones
Drama Desk Nom., "Outstanding Actor in a Play" – John Douglas Thompson, The Emperor Jones
Drama Desk Nom., "Outstanding Costume Design" – Antonia Ford-Roberts and Bob Flanagan, The Emperor Jones
Hewes Design Award Nom., "Scenic Design" – Charlie Corcoran, The Emperor Jones
6 AUDELCO Award Nominations, including "Best Revival" – The Emperor Jones
Lucille Lortel Nom., "Outstanding Revival" – Candida
Drama Desk Nom., "Outstanding Actress in a Play" – Melissa Errico, Candida
Drama Desk Nom., "Outstanding Featured Actress in a Play" – Xanthe Elbrick, Candida
Hewes Design Award Nom., "Lighting Design" – Clifton Taylor, White Woman Street
Irish America, "50 Most Influential Women" – Charlotte Moore

2011

The 2011 Eugene O'Neill Lifetime Achievement Award

2012
Off-Broadway Alliance Nomination, "Best Revival," Beyond the Horizon
Drama Desk Nom., "Unique Theatrical Experience," Give Me Your Hand
Joe A. Callaway Award Nomination, "Best Director," Charlotte Moore, Dancing at Lughnasa
Drama Desk Nom., "Unique Theatrical Experience,"NOCTU
Drama Desk Nom., "Best Choreographer," Brendán de Gallai, NOCTU

2013

Lucille Lortel Nom., "Outstanding Revival" – The Weir
Joe A. Callaway Award, "Best Actress" J. Smith Cameron, Juno and the Paycock
Joe A. Callaway Award Nomination, "Best Director" Ciarán O'Reilly, The Weir
Outer Critics Circle Special Achievement Award ― Charlotte Moore and Ciarán O'Reilly in recognition of 25 years of producing outstanding theater.
Drama Desk Award Nomination, "Outstanding Actress in a Musical," Jenny Powers, Donnybrook!
Drama Desk Award Nomination, "Outstanding Solo Performance," Julian Sands, A Celebration of Harold Pinter

2014

Outer Critics Circle Nom., "Outstanding New Off-Broadway Musical" – A Christmas Memory
Winner, 1st Irish Festival, "Outstanding Production" – Port Authority & "Best Actor" Peter Maloney

2015

Winner, 1st Irish Festival, "Best Playwright" – John McManus, The Quare Land 
Winner, 1st Irish Festival, "Best Director," Ciarán O'Reilly, The Quare Land 
Winner, 1st Irish Festival, "Best Design" The Quare Land 
1st Irish Festival Special Jury Prize, Peter Maloney, for his performance in The Quare Land

2016

Irish America, "50 Most Influential Women" – Charlotte Moore

2017

Obie Award, "Outstanding Performance" to Matthew Broderick for Shining City
Obie Award, "Excellence in Sound Design" to Ryan Rumery for The Emperor Jones
Drama Desk Nomination, "Outstanding Fight Choreography," Donal O'Farrell for Quietly
Off-Broadway Alliance "Legend of the Theatre," Charlotte Moore
Off-Broadway Alliance Award nomination, "Best Play Revival," The Emperor Jones
2017 Chita Rivera Award, "Outstanding Female Dancer in an Off-Broadway Show" for Finian’s Rainbow, Lyrica Woodruff
Off-Broadway Alliance Award nomination, "Best Musical Revival," Finian’s Rainbow
Outer Critics Circle Nomination, "Best Revival of a Musical (Broadway or Off-Broadway)," Finian’s Rainbow

2018

Off Broadway Alliance Awards Nomination, "Best New Musical" for Woody Sez
Outer Critics Circle Awards Nomination, "Outstanding New Off-Broadway Musical" for Woody Sez
Outer Critics Circle Awards Nomination, "Outstanding Actor in a Musical" for David M. Lutken, Woody Sez
Chita Rivera Awards Nomination, Colin Campbell for Disco Pigs
1st Irish Festival Special Jury Prize, Colin Campbell, for his performance in Disco Pigs

References
Notes

External links
 Irish Repertory Theatre
 Irish Repertory Theatre on NYCkidsARTS.org
 

Irish literature
Irish-American culture in New York City
Off-Broadway theaters
Arts organizations established in 1988
1988 establishments in New York City